Interlace or interlacing may refer to:

 Interlace (art), a decorative element found especially in early Medieval art in Northern Europe
 Interlacing (bitmaps), a method of incrementally displaying raster graphics
 Interlaced video is a technique of doubling the perceived frame rate without consuming extra bandwidth
 Interlaced track on railways and tramways is where two rail lines overlap spatially but are not connected
 The Interlace, an apartment building in Singapore
 Interlace or Entrelacement, a medieval literary mode switching between parallel narrative threads found in such texts as Nibelungenlied, Poetic Edda, and The Lord of the Rings